The European Women's Beach Handball Championship is the official competition for women's senior national beach handball teams of Europe. It was first organized by the EHF in 2000. In addition to crowning the European champions, the tournament also serves as a qualifying tournament for the World Championships.

Summary

Medal table

See also
World Women's Beach Handball Championship

References

 
Handball competitions in Europe
Beach handball competitions
European championships